Mount Charter is an extinct volcano located on The West Coast Of Tasmania, Australia. 

Geology
Mount Charter was a major shield volcano of the Mount Read Volcanics on Tasmania West Coast.
The last eruption was 500 million years ago.

Zinc mineralization has been identified on the slopes of Mount Charter, however, to date mining has not occurred.

References

Volcanoes of Tasmania
Inactive volcanoes